"Light of My Life" is a song by British singer Louise, released as her first single as a solo artist following her departure from Eternal earlier that year. Released on 25 September 1995, the ballad reached number eight on the UK Singles Chart and number 18 in Ireland. A music video was made for the song, directed by Russell Young.

Critical reception
Jon O'Brien from AllMusic described "Light of My Life" as "a lighters-in-the-air ballad". James Masterton for Dotmusic viewed the song as "a beautiful ballad that shows her voice off to perfect effect". Pan-European magazine Music & Media wrote, "For her debut single, Louise, once a member of Eternal, cites Stevie Wonder and Quincy Jones as major influences. This smooth ballad, penned by producer Simon Climie, is certainly a change from the up-tempo energy of Eternal." A reviewer from Music Week deemed it as "a disappointing track that may do well but is unlikely to have Eternal worrying too much." Mark Sutherland from NME desscribed it as a "Mariah Carey-esque ballad".

Track listings

 UK CD1 and Australian CD single
 "Light of My Life"
 "Light of My Life" (piano and vocal mix)
 "Real Love"

 UK CD2
 "Light of My Life"
 "Real Love" (Tin Tin Out remix)
 "Real Love" (Stonebridge remix)
 Exclusive interview with Louise

 UK cassette single
 "Light of My Life"
 "Real Love"

 European CD single
 "Light of My Life"
 "Light of My Life" (piano and vocal mix)
 "Real Love" (Tin Tin Out remix)
 "Real Love" (Stonebridge remix)

Charts

Weekly charts

Year-end charts

References

1990s ballads
1995 debut singles
1995 songs
EMI Records singles
First Avenue Records singles
Louise Redknapp songs
Songs written by Denis Ingoldsby
Songs written by Oliver Smallman
Songs written by Simon Climie